Bola Odeleke (born 1950) is a Nigerian pastor, evangelist, preacher, founder and general overseer of Power Pentecostal Church.

Early life
She hails from Ibadan, the capital of Oyo State, southwestern Nigeria.
She had her primary and secondary  education at Ilesa, the hometown of her mother.
She became a Christian in 1970 but began her evangelism in November 1974 and in August 2014, she celebrated her 40th anniversary in the ministry.
She became a bishop on 28 May 1995, and was the first African woman to become a bishop.

References

Living people
1950 births
People from Oyo State
Nigerian religious leaders
Nigerian Protestant missionaries
Yoruba Christian clergy
Women bishops
Nigerian Pentecostal pastors
Pentecostal missionaries
Protestant missionaries in Nigeria
Female Christian missionaries